State Highway 10 (SH 10) is a State Highway in Kerala, India, that starts in Mavelikkara and ends in Kozhencherry. The highway is 28.7 km long.

Route description 
Mavelikkara - Puthiyacavu - Cherianad - Perisseri - Chengannur (Joins and overlaps MC Road) - Malakkara - Aranmula - Thekkemala (joins and overlaps T.K.Road / SH - 07 to Pathanamthitta) - Kozhencherry

See also 
Roads in Kerala
List of State Highways in Kerala

References 

Roads in Alappuzha district
Roads in Pathanamthitta district